The Nebraska Department of Health & Human Services (DHHS) is a state agency of Nebraska, headquartered in Lincoln. The agency provides health and human services for both families and regular patients. DHHS is Nebraska's largest agency and is responsible for nearly one-third of the state's government, both in employees and budget.

DHHS consists of five divisions, seven facilities, and eight operational areas. The five divisions are:

 Behavioral Health
 Children and Family Services
 Developmental Disabilities
 Medicaid and Long-Term Care
 Public Health

At the end of June 2018, DHHS had 4,651 full-time equivalent employees and a budget totaling $3,580,658,297.

Division of Children and Family Services
Youth Rehabilitation & Treatment Center - Kearney (YRTC-K) in Kearney is the juvenile correctional facility for boys. Youth Rehabilitation &  Treatment Center - Geneva (YRTC-G) in unincorporated Fillmore County, near Geneva, is the juvenile correctional facility for girls. The Nebraska Department of Correctional Services managed those facilities for 23 years; on January 1, 1997, the youth correctional facilities were transferred out of the scope of the Nebraska Department of Correctional Services.

References

External links
 Nebraska Department of Health & Human Services

State agencies of Nebraska
Juvenile detention centers in the United States
State corrections departments of the United States
State departments of health of the United States
Medical and health organizations based in Nebraska